Resistance wire is wire intended for making electrical resistors (which are used to control the amount of current in a circuit). It is better if the alloy used has a high resistivity, since a shorter wire can then be used. In many situations, the stability of the resistor is of primary importance, and thus the alloy's temperature coefficient of resistivity and corrosion resistance play a large part in material selection.

When resistance wire is used for  heating elements (in electric heaters,  toasters, and the like), high resistivity and oxidation resistance is important.

Sometimes resistance wire is insulated by ceramic powder and sheathed in a tube of another alloy. Such heating elements are used in electric ovens and water heaters, and in specialized forms for cooktops.



Types
Nichrome, a non-magnetic 80/20 alloy of nickel and chromium, is the most common resistance wire for heating purposes because it has a high resistivity and resistance to oxidation at high temperatures. When used as a heating element, resistance wire is usually wound into coils.  One difficulty in using nichrome wire is that common tin-based electrical solder will not bond with it, so the connections to the electrical power must be made using other methods such as crimp connectors or screw terminals.

Kanthal (Alloy 875/815), a family of iron-chromium-aluminium alloys is used in a wide range of high-temperature applications.

Constantan has a low temperature coefficient of resistivity and as a copper alloy, is easily soldered. Other constant-resistance alloys include manganin, Cupron  and Evanohm.

The Evanohm family of nickel-chrome alloys ( and ) have high resistance, low temperature coefficient of resistance, low electromotive force (Galvani potential) when in contact with copper, high tensile strength, and also are very stable with regards to heat treatment.

Balco and similar alloys have very high, but more linear, temperature coefficient of resistivity, making them suitable for sensing elements.

Many elements and alloys have been used as resistance wire for special purposes. The table below lists the resistivity of some common materials.  The resistivity of amorphous carbon actually has a range of 3.8 - 4.1 × 10−6 Ω m.

Trade names 

Trade names include:

References 

Wire
Heating, ventilation, and air conditioning
Resistive components